Parastreptocephalus is a subgenus of the fairy shrimp genus Streptocephalus, characterised by features of the male antennae and the tetrahedral shape of the eggs. It comprises six species:
Streptocephalus kaokoensis Barnard, 1929 – Namibia 
Streptocephalus lamellifer Thiele, 1900 – Tanzania 
Streptocephalus queenslandicus Herbert & Timms, 2000 – Queensland 
Streptocephalus siamensis Sanoamuang & Saengphan, 2006 – Thailand 
Streptocephalus sudanicus Daday de Dées, 1910 – Sahel 
Streptocephalus zuluensis Brendonck & Hamer, 1992 – Zimbabwe & South Africa, endangered

References

Anostraca
Animal subgenera